12 bis was a French publisher active from 27 June 2007 to 1 August 2017, which has since been absorbed by Glénat. The company published predominantly bande dessinée comic books and manga in France. It was founded by Dominique Burdot, former managing director of publications at Glénat, and Laurent Muller, the previous editorial director also at Glénat.

The website was created in December 2009.

The publisher had undertaken reprinting of previously successful works by François Bourgeon, Les Passagers du vent (the Passengers of the Wind) and Le Cycle de Cyann (The Cycle of Cyann). 

The company also published the comic book satire concerning American wine critic Robert M. Parker, Jr., Robert Parker: Les Sept Pêchés capiteux.

Monetary losses during operation led to the redressement judicaire (legal redress) of the company on 30 April 2013. During a redressement judicaire businesses facing hardship may avoid paying fees in order to save the business, however, if unsuccessful they must be liquidated. With debts of €2,902,928 including €1,196,753 in unpaid copyrighting fees, 12 bis was forced to liquidate. On 4 September 2013 Glénat acquired the remaining assets, which included the entire 12 bis catalogue except for the works of François Bourgeon.

References

External links

12 bis Official Website
Mangakakalot Website
Manga Reading Website

Book publishing companies of France
French companies established in 2008
Comic book publishing companies of France
Manga distributors
French brands
2008 establishments in France